FC Pivovar Veľký Šariš is a Slovak football team, based in the town of Veľký Šariš. The club was founded in 1919.

External links 
  
 Club profile at Futbalnet 
 at fcpivovarvs.szm.sk

References

Pivovar Velky Saris
Association football clubs established in 1919